Frederick Morgan Davenport (August 27, 1866 – December 26, 1956) was a Republican member of the United States House of Representatives from New York.

Life and career
Davenport was born in Salem, Massachusetts, the son of Anna L. (Green) and David Davenport. He graduated from Wesleyan University in 1889; and from Columbia University in 1905. He taught political science at Hamilton College from 1904 to 1929.

He was a member of the New York State Senate (36th D.) in 1909 and 1910. He ran on the Progressive ticket for Lieutenant Governor of New York at the New York state election, 1912; and for Governor of New York at the New York state election, 1914.

He was again a member of the State Senate (36th D.) from 1919 to 1924, sitting in the 142nd, 143rd, 144th, 145th, 146th and 147th New York State Legislatures; and was a delegate to the 1924 Republican National Convention.

He was elected as a Republican to the 69th, 70th, 71st and 72nd United States Congresses, holding office from March 4, 1925, to March 3, 1933.

He died on December 26, 1956, in Washington, D.C.

Sources

References

Republican Party New York (state) state senators
Wesleyan University alumni
Columbia University alumni
Hamilton College (New York) faculty
Political science educators
1866 births
1956 deaths
New York (state) Progressives (1912)
20th-century American politicians
Republican Party members of the United States House of Representatives from New York (state)